Federal Route 23, or Jalan Muar–Tangkak–Segamat, is a federal road in Johor, Malaysia, connecting Segamat in the north and Parit Bunga in the south. It is also a main route to North–South Expressway Southern Route via Tangkak Interchange.

Route background
The Kilometre Zero of the Federal Route 23 starts at Parit Bunga, at its interchange with the Federal Route 5, the main trunk road of the west coast of Peninsular Malaysia.

Features
 Many Chinese cemeteries along the road between Bukit Kangkar and Tangkak
 A main route to Gunung Ledang
 Tangkak, a textile town of Johor

At most sections, the Federal Route 23 was built under the JKR R5 road standard, allowing maximum speed limit of up to 90 km/h.

Upgrading of the roads from Segamat to Tangkak
On 7 December 2007, the federal government decided to upgrade the 40-km stretch from Segamat to Tangkak from a two-lane road to a four-lane road.

Construction of the Segamat–Tangkak–Muar Highway
Construction of the 63-km Segamat–Tangkak–Muar Highway, estimated to cost between RM750 million and RM770 million, was to begin in November 2011. The road upgrading project will be carried out in five packages including an upgrading 14 bridges along the route. Package 1b and 2 of the highway were completed on 2015.

List of junctions and towns

References

023